Albane Valenzuela (born 17 December 1997) is a Swiss professional golfer and a two-time Olympian. She was born in New York City to a Mexican father and French mother. She became a Swiss citizen at age 14.

Amateur career
Valenzuela took low amateur honors at the 2016 ANA Inspiration. She also made the cut at the 2016 U.S. Women's Open. She had two top-5 finishes on the Ladies European Tour in 2016 and a top-10 finish in the 2014 Lacoste Ladies French Open with a tournament low round of 64.

Valenzuela qualified for the 2016 Summer Olympics. She was the number one ranked golfer in Switzerland and reached number two in the World Amateur Golf Rankings. Valenzuela also won the European Golf Association European Order of Merit in 2018.

Valenzuela reached the final of the 2017 U.S. Women's Amateur, losing to Sophia Schubert, 6 and 5. In 2019, she again reached the finals, losing to Gabriela Ruffels, 1 up. Valenzuela was also runner-up in the European Ladies Amateur Championship in 2017.

Valenzuela played college golf at Stanford University before turning professional in late 2019. Valenzuela was named Pac-12 Player of the Year in 2019 and was a Ping/WGCA First Team All-American. She was a recipient of the WGCA's Edith Cummings Munson Award which is given to one of the top collegiate female golfers who excels in academics. She was also named to the Google Cloud CoSIDA first team Academic All-American. She graduated in 2020 with a degree in political science and was awarded Phi Beta Kappa.

Professional career
Valenzuela turned professional after earning her LPGA Tour card by finishing T-6 at Q Series in November 2019. She represented Switzerland at the 2020 Tokyo Olympics.

Amateur wins
2013 Swiss National Match Play Championship (with Rachel Rossel), Bulgarian Amateur Open
2014 Swiss International Championship
2015 Spanish International Stroke Play, Doral Publix Junior Classic, Junior Orange Bowl International Golf Championship
2017 NCAA Albuquerque Regional
2018 East Lake Cup
2019 Pac-12 Championship

Sources:

Results in LPGA majors
Results not in chronological order.

CUT = missed the half-way cut
NT = no tournament
T = tied

Team appearances
Amateur
Junior Vagliano Trophy (representing the Continent of Europe): 2013 (winners)
Espirito Santo Trophy (representing Switzerland): 2014, 2018
Junior Solheim Cup (representing Europe): 2015
Vagliano Trophy (representing the Continent of Europe): 2015 (winners), 2017 (winners), 2019 (winners)
Patsy Hankins Trophy (representing Europe): 2016
Arnold Palmer Cup (representing the International team): 2018
European Ladies' Team Championship (representing Switzerland): 2014, 2015, 2017
European Girls' Team Championship (representing Switzerland): 2012, 2013

References

External links

Swiss female golfers
LPGA Tour golfers
Olympic golfers of Switzerland
Golfers at the 2016 Summer Olympics
Golfers at the 2020 Summer Olympics
Stanford Cardinal women's golfers
Sportspeople from New York City
1997 births
Living people
21st-century American women
20th-century American women
21st-century Swiss women
20th-century Swiss women